Darevskia sapphirina is a lizard species in the genus Darevskia. It is endemic to Turkey.

References

Darevskia
Reptiles of Turkey
Endemic fauna of Turkey
Reptiles described in 1994
Taxa named by Josef Friedrich Schmidtler
Taxa named by Josef Eiselt
Taxa named by Ilya Darevsky